The Tel Aviv District is the smallest and most densely populated of the six administrative districts of Israel with a population of 1.35 million residents. It is 98.9% Jewish and 1.10% Arab (0.7% Muslim, 0.4% Christian). 

The district's capital is Tel Aviv, one of the two largest cities in Israel and the country's economic, business and technological capital. The metropolitan area created by the Tel Aviv district and its neighboring cities is locally named Gush Dan.

It is the only one of the six districts not adjacent to either the West Bank or an international border, being surrounded on the north, east, and south by the Central District and on the west by the Mediterranean Sea. The population density of the Tel Aviv district is 7,259/km2.

Administrative local authorities

Notes

List of cities and towns in Tel Aviv district

See also

 Districts of Israel
 List of cities in Israel

References

External links